The 1979–80 Penn State Nittany Lions basketball team represented Pennsylvania State University in the 1979–80 season.

Roster

Schedule

Source

References 

1979
1979–80 NCAA Division I men's basketball independents season
1980 National Invitation Tournament participants
1979 in sports in Pennsylvania
1980 in sports in Pennsylvania